The Uruguayan Basketball Federation (FUBB) is the governing body of basketball in Uruguay. It was founded in 1915, and is in charge of the senior Uruguayan national basketball team and the Liga Uruguaya de Básquetbol (LUB).

History 

Under the presidency of Federico Crocker. Basketball languished in Uruguay under the effects of Association football's popularity; at the 1936 Olympic Games, however, the Uruguayan National basketball team obtained a sixth place, which helped boost the sport's popularity in the Latin American country. That same year, the "FUBB" became a member of FIBA. After, the Uruguayan Basketball team won two bronze medals, in the olympic games of Helsinki 1952 and Melbourne 1956, both times after USA and USSR.

Later on, basketball in Uruguay also confronted a rivalry in the form of rugby. Basketball has, however, enjoyed steady popularity in the country, a fact which has helped the Federación Uruguaya de Básquetbol in Spanish) to survive for more than 90 years.

Federico Slinger took over presidency of the federation in 1981; he remained in office for sixteen years, holding the record for the longest tenure as president of the Uruguayan Basketball Federation.

After the 2005 season, the "FUBB" announced that Uruguayan police had become considered an important ally in order to prevent violence among fans during or after professional basketball games in Uruguay.

Presidents 
A list of presidents of the Uruguayan Basketball Federation:

Tournaments organized

Uruguayan Basketball League 

The professional era Liga Uruguaya de Básquetbol (LUB; Uruguayan Basketball League) competition began in 2003.

Torneo Metropolitano 
A list of Federación Torneo Metropolitano teams (2018):

 Bohemios
 Unión Atlética
 Tabaré
 
 Auriblanco
 Larrañaga
 Olivol Mundial
 Colón
 Stockolmo

Third division teams (DTA – Divisional Tercera de Ascenso) 
A list of Federacion Uruguaya de Basketball Tercera de Ascenso (3rd division) teams (2018):

 Marne
 Yale
 Reducto
 Capurro
 Montevideo
 Peñarol
 Danubio Fútbol Club
 San Telmo Rápido Sport
 Urupan
 Albatros
 Deportivo Paysandú

Other teams (2018) 
 Cutcsa
 Cader
 Romis
 Romis Nelimar
 Guruyú Waston
 Anastasia
 Juventus
 Paysandú Wanderers
 Allavena
 Pelotaris
 Universitario
 Flores BBC
 Lagomar
 Lavalleja
 Maldonado
 Plaza NH
 Remeros

Uruguayan Federal Basketball Championship 

The Campeonato Uruguayo Federal de Básquetbol (Uruguayan Federal Basketball Championship) was founded in 1915, making it among the oldest basketball competitions on the South American continent. Until the Uruguayan Basketball League was created in 2003, the Montevideo clubs were playing in the Uruguayan Federal Basketball Championship, while the rest of the country's clubs played in regional tournaments. The Uruguayan basketball championships were only local, and no competition brought all of the clubs in the country together.

List of first division Uruguayan champions by season

References

External links 
 Uruguyan Basketball Federation (FUBB) official website 
 Uruguayan Basketball League at Latinbasket.com

1915 establishments in Uruguay
Basketball governing bodies in South America
Basketball in Uruguay
National members of the FIBA Americas
Bas
Sports organizations established in 1915